PT Lion Group is a privately owned, airline holding company, based in Indonesia. The group consists of several airlines from Southeast Asia, currently Lion Air, Wings Air, Batik Air, Super Air Jet, Batik Air Malaysia, and Thai Lion Air. The Lion Air Group primarily competes with the Malaysian-based low-cost carrier, AirAsia and domestic competitor and national airline Garuda Indonesia.

History

The airline group is founded on the success of Lion Air, which was founded in 1999. With the growth of aviation and travel within Indonesia, Lion Air founded Wings Air in 2003, a regional carrier wholly owned by Lion Air.

Regional expansion
With the expansion of regional rival AirAsia into the Indonesian aviation market, the Lion Group established Malindo Air in 2012, to compete with AirAsia in the Malaysian aviation market. The airline's name derived from a combination of the countries Malaysia and Indonesia.

Local competition from national airline Garuda Indonesia also arose in 2012, as Garuda announced intentions to form an off-shoot of its Citilink brand into its own low-cost carrier. Further intentions to expand Citilink were announced, such that it could compete with Lion Air in the domestic low-cost travel market. In response, Lion Group announced a full-service competitor to Garuda Indonesia in the form of Batik Air.

To further expand into the region, Lion Air announced its intention to launch Thai Lion Air, based in Bangkok, Thailand. This would allow the group to further encroach on AirAsia's market share, as well as compete with local low-cost carrier Nok Air.

In 2017, the Lion Air Group managed to surpass 50% market share domestically for the first time.

Operations
The Lion Air Group are based in three different countries in Southeast Asia and have several operations, most of which are airlines.

Operators and fleet

Subsidiary company

Lion Parcel 
PT. Lion Express also known as Lion Parcel is a subsidiary company of Lion Air Group, is the logistic company that serves nationwide and Asia. Their services is door-to-door delivery enhanced with Innovation and Technology.

Environmental record 
Lion Parcel has taken measures to control their environmental effect by use of electric vehicles produced by GESITS (PT Wika Industri Manufaktur). Lion Parcel changed vehicles in certain delivery fleets in order to use electric vehicles. Certain new vehicles use electricity, to which Lion Parcel hopes to reduce air pollution in Indonesia and carbon emission produced by conventional vehicle. With this initiative, they become the first logistic company in Indonesia that has implement the use of electric vehicles.

Awards 
 Gold Predicate from Indonesian Contact Center Association (ICCA) during The Best Contact Center Indonesia 2021'2 event for category "The Best Digital Media"
  Impactful Digital Marketing Campaign of The Year for JAGOPACK, Marketeers Editor's Choice Award 2021
  Industry Marketing Champion 2021 for the Logistics Sector, Marketeer of the Year 2021, MARKPLUS, INC.

See also
List of airline holding companies

References

External links

Airline holding companies